Route 363 is a  long east–west secondary highway in the northeast portion of New Brunswick, Canada.

The route's eastern terminus is east of the community of Saint-Sauveur. The road travels east to through the communities of Butte-D'Or and Spruce Brook before ending in Hacheyville.

Intersecting routes
None

See also

References

363
363